Waelder is a city in Gonzales County, Texas, United States and is also part of the Texas-German belt. The population was 933 at the 2020 census.

Geography

Waelder is located at  (29.693658, –97.298288).

Climate

The climate in this area is characterized by hot, humid summers and generally mild to cool winters.  According to the Köppen Climate Classification system, Waelder has a humid subtropical climate, abbreviated "Cfa" on climate maps.

Demographics

As of the 2020 United States census, there were 933 people, 391 households, and 290 families residing in the city.

As of the census of 2010, there were 1065 people, 362 households, and 255 families residing in the city. The population density was 819.2 people per square mile (322.7/km). There were 443 housing units at an average density of 322.9/mi2 (124.6/km). The racial makeup of the city was 50.2% White, 13.3% African American, 1.2% Native American, 33.2% from other races, and 2.0% from two or more races. Hispanic or Latino of any race were 77.6% of the population.

There were 362 households, out of which 30.4% had children under the age of 18 living with them, 41.4% were married couples living together, 19.1% had a female householder with no husband present, and 29.6% were non-families. 22.7% of all households were made up of individuals living alone, and 8.9% were made up of individuals 65 years of age or older living alone. The average household size was 2.94 and the average family size was 3.4.

In the town, the population was spread out, with 26.9% under the age of 18, 11.8% from 18 to 24, 32.5% from 25 to 49, 19.4% from 50 to 64, and 9.4% who were 65 years of age or older. The median age was 33.9 years. For every 100 females, there were 110.5 males. For every 100 females age 18 and over, there were 120.1 males.

The median income for a household in the Waelder was $24,152, and the median income for a family was $39,792. Its per capita income was $11,417. Full-time, year-round working males had a median income of $28,487 versus $15,969 for full-time, year-round working females. About 13.4% of families and 23.7% of the population were below the poverty line, including 25.2% of those under age 18 and 36.9% of those age 65 or over.

Business
Waelder is home to the J Bar B Foods factory, where meat products are produced and shipped to local stores. Waelder was recently featured in a "My H-E-B" commercial.

Schools
See Waelder Independent School District.

Media
Two newspapers, The Gonzales Inquirer and The Gonzales Cannon, provide local news coverage for Waelder.

References

External links
 Official homepage for the City of Waelder
 Ryan Tovar has created a website dedicated to Waelder's history, including a section with several articles & stories, information about local historical markers and a section with recent & historical photos. The discussion forums, a recently added feature, allows interested parties to discuss current local events or request assistance in researching family histories.
 The Gonzales Inquirer
 The Gonzales Cannon

Cities in Gonzales County, Texas
Cities in Texas
1880s establishments in Texas